Them Crooked Vultures is the debut studio album by American rock supergroup Them Crooked Vultures. It was released on November 13, 2009. The first single from the album, "New Fang", was released on October 26, 2009, followed by "Mind Eraser, No Chaser" on November 3. The album debuted at number 12 on the Billboard 200, selling 70,000 units in the US in its first week.

Release history
The first single from the album, "New Fang", was released on October 26, 2009. On November 3, 2009, they released their second single, via free download on iTunes, entitled "Mind Eraser, No Chaser".

The album was first released on November 13, 2009, in Ireland, Germany, the Netherlands, Belgium and Australia. It was then released by DGC/Interscope in the United States on November 17, 2009; it was released in the United Kingdom by Columbia a day earlier. Prior to release, the album could be viewed on the band's YouTube channel.

The song "Scumbag Blues" was released as a playable track on the 2010 video games Guitar Hero: Warriors of Rock and Gran Turismo 5, while "Dead End Friends" is playable in Rock Band 3 and featured in Skate 3.

Reception

The album received a Metascore of 75 from review aggregator Metacritic, based on 23 critics, indicating generally favorable reviews. Rhapsody deemed it the 19th best album of 2009. Chicago Tribune reviewer Greg Kot was particularly complimentary of the album, giving it a rating of 3.5/4, he said "Nasty riffs and sticky melodies are everywhere". He also praised multi-instrumentalist John Paul Jones, saying his "mastery of texture, whether on funky Clavinet for 'Scumbag Blues,' classical piano on 'Spinning in Daffodils' or slide guitar for 'Reptiles,' is the band's secret weapon". The A.V. Clubs Steven Hyden said the group's album "doesn’t equal the considerable awesomeness of its ancestors (the aforementioned Led Zeppelin, Nirvana and Queens of the Stone Age); it sounds like a second-tier Queens Of The Stone Age record", and that it "could have fit comfortably under Homme’s usual banner". He did however, commend it for being "a hell of a lot of fun" and awarded it a B+, adding "The biggest pleasure of Them Crooked Vultures is hearing three supremely gifted players fall together quickly and easily on songs built on simple riffs that sound like they were made up on a lark five minutes earlier."

David Quantick of BBC gave the album a highly favorable review saying "Their debut album is very good indeed. Released, rather oddly, at virtually the same time as Foo Fighters' new greatest hits collection, this album sounds by and large like QOTSA, as Homme sings and plays guitar, but with – unsurprisingly really – Zeppelin-esque touches. From 'Scumbag Blues', which could have fitted loudly on the second Zep’ album, to the superb single 'No One Loves Me & Neither Do I', which is a distant cousin to 'Trampled Under Foot', this is a proper rock album that's very aware of its roots."

Track listing

PersonnelThem Crooked Vultures Josh Homme – vocals, guitars, production
 John Paul Jones – bass guitar, keyboards, piano, clavinet, optigan, mandolin, backing vocals, production
 Dave Grohl – drums, percussion, backing vocals, productionProduction personnel Alan Moulder – recording, mixing
 Alain Johannes – recording on "Dead End Friends", "Reptiles", and "Interlude with Ludes", backing vocals
 Justin Smith – recording assistance
 Chris Kaysch – mixing assistance
 Brian Gardner – mastering
 Mike Bozzi – mastering assistanceAdditional personnel'
 Liam Lynch – artwork, graphic design
 Morning Breath – art direction

Chart positions

Weekly charts

Year-end charts

Certifications

References

 

2009 debut albums
Them Crooked Vultures albums
RCA Records albums
Interscope Records albums
DGC Records albums
Albums produced by Josh Homme